Terribacillus aidingensis is a Gram-positive, moderately halophilic, rod-shaped and motile bacterium from the genus of Terribacillus which has been isolated from soil from the Ayding Lake in China.

References

External links 
Type strain of Terribacillus aidingensis at BacDive -  the Bacterial Diversity Metadatabase
 

Bacillaceae
Bacteria described in 2010